The Outer Continental Shelf (OCS) is a feature of the geography of the United States. The OCS is the part of the internationally recognized continental shelf of the United States which does not fall under the jurisdictions of the individual U.S. states.

Definition
Formally, the OCS is governed by Title 43, Chapter 29 "Submerged Lands", Subchapter III "Outer Continental Shelf Lands", of the U.S. Code. The term "outer Continental Shelf" refers to  all submerged land, its subsoil and seabed that belong to the United States and are lying seaward and outside the states' jurisdiction, the latter defined as the "lands beneath navigable waters" in Title 43, Chapter 29, Subchapter I, Section 1301.

The United States OCS has been divided into four leasing regions:
Gulf of Mexico OCS Region
Atlantic OCS Region 
Pacific OCS Region 
Alaska OCS Region

State jurisdiction is defined as follows:
Texas and the Gulf coast of Florida are extended 3 marine leagues (approximately 9 nautical miles) seaward from the baseline from which the breadth of the territorial sea is measured.
Louisiana is extended  seaward of the baseline from which the breadth of the territorial sea is measured (as defined pre-1954 in the U.S.: nautical mile = 6080.2 feet).
All other States' seaward limits are extended 3 international nautical miles (5.556 km; 3.452 mi) seaward of the baseline from which the breadth of the territorial sea is measured.

Federal jurisdiction is defined under accepted principles of public international law. The seaward limit is defined as the farthest of  seaward of the baseline from which the breadth of the territorial sea is measured or, if the continental shelf can be shown to exceed 200 nautical miles, a distance not greater than a line 100 nautical miles from the  isobath or a line  from the baseline.

Outer Continental Shelf limits greater than 200 nautical miles but less than either the 2,500-meter isobath plus 100 nmi or 350 nmi are defined by a line  seaward of the foot of the continental slope or by a line seaward of the foot of the continental slope connecting points where the sediment thickness divided by the distance to the foot of the slope equals 0.01, whichever is farthest.

Coastlines are emergent coastline.  Thus the landward boundary of the outer continental shelf is a legal construct rather than a physical construct, modified only at intervals by appropriate processes of law.

For legislation concerning the OCS, the United States Senate Committee on Commerce, Science & Transportation has jurisdiction within the United States Senate.  In the House of Representatives, the Committee on Natural Resources Subcommittee on Energy and Mineral Resources has jurisdiction over administration and legislation amending the OCSLA. One of the main pieces of legislature affecting the OCS is the Outer Continental Shelf Lands Act (OCSLA), created on August 7, 1953, which defined the OCS as all submerged lands lying seaward of state coastal waters (3 miles offshore) under U.S. jurisdiction; under the OCSLA, the Secretary of the Interior is responsible for the administration of mineral exploration and development of the OCS. The OCSLA has been amended several times, most recently as a result of the Energy Policy Act of 2005.

After Congress passed the Federal Oil and Gas Royalty Management Act in 1982, the Secretary of the Interior designated the Minerals Management Service (MMS) as the administrative agency responsible for the mineral leasing of submerged OCS lands and for the supervision of offshore operations; in 2010 MMS was renamed the Bureau of Ocean Energy Management, Regulation and Enforcement (BOEMRE). On October 1, 2011, BOEMRE was divided into two bureaus, the Bureau of Safety and Environmental Enforcement (BSEE) and the Bureau of Ocean Energy Management (BOEM). BSEE is the agency charged to provide regulatory oversight of deepwater oil drilling and offshore wind energy sources in U.S. Federal waters that extend beyond State jurisdiction.

See also 
 Beach evolution
 Chukchi Sea Shelf
 Coastal geography
 Coastal States Organization
 International Boundary and Water Commission
 Maritime Security Regimes
 Maritime security (USCG)
 United Nations Convention on the Law of the Sea (Law of the Sea Treaty)

References

External links 
 UNEP Shelf Programme

Landforms of the Pacific Ocean
Landforms of the United States
Borders of the United States
Continental shelves of North America
Landforms of the Atlantic Ocean
Landforms of the Arctic Ocean
United States public land law